Porter is an unincorporated community in Jefferson County, in the U.S. state of Pennsylvania.

History
A post office called Porter was established in 1850, and remained in operation until 1973. The community is located in Porter Township, which was named for Commodore David Porter.

References

Unincorporated communities in Jefferson County, Pennsylvania
Unincorporated communities in Pennsylvania